Koloonella ignorabilis is a species of sea snail, a marine gastropod mollusk in the family Pyramidellidae, the pyrams and their allies.

Description
The size of the shell varies between 3.5 mm and 5.2 mm.

Distribution
This species occurs in the Atlantic Ocean between Mauritania, Guinea and Angola at depths between 0 m and 75 m.

References

 Robba E. (2013) Tertiary and Quaternary fossil pyramidelloidean gastropods of Indonesia. Scripta Geologica 144: 1-191

External links
 To World Register of Marine Species

Pyramidellidae
Gastropods described in 1997